Fifinella was a female gremlin designed by Walt Disney for a proposed film from Roald Dahl's book The Gremlins. During World War II, the Women Airforce Service Pilots (WASP) asked permission to use the image as their official mascot, and the Disney Company granted them the rights.

Origins
The story of Fifinella began in 1942 when Roald Dahl, who had been removed from flying with the RAF due to injury, wrote The Gremlins, a fairy tale about the hazards of combat flying; in this incarnation, the word "fifinella" only refers to female gremlins as opposed to any specific one. Dahl took the name from the great "flying" filly, Fifinella, who won The Derby and Epsom Oaks in 1916, the year Dahl was born. As an RAF-trained pilot, he was familiar with prewar RAF folklore about the Gremlin, the mischievous source of any unknown problem. Although gremlins predated Murphy's Law that "whatever can go wrong, will go wrong," they were obviously motivated by the same principles.
Finella was used as the WASP badge

The Gremlins

The Gremlins is a children's book, written by Roald Dahl. It was published in 1943 by Random House for Walt Disney and serialized in Cosmopolitan. It was Dahl's first children's book, and was written for Walt Disney Productions, as a promotional device for a feature-length animated film that was never made. With Dahl's assistance, a series of gremlin characters was developed, and although pre-production began, the film project was eventually abandoned, in part because the studio could not establish the precise rights of the "gremlin" story, and in part because the British Air Ministry, which was heavily involved in the production because Dahl was on leave from his wartime Washington posting, insisted on final approval of script and production.

The publication of The Gremlins by Random House consisted of a 50,000 run for the U.S. market with Dahl ordering 50 copies for himself as promotional material, handing them out to everyone he knew, including Lord Halifax and First Lady Eleanor Roosevelt, who read the book to her grandchildren. The book was considered an international success with 30,000 more sold in Australia but initial efforts to reprint the book were precluded by a wartime paper shortage. Reviewed in major publications, Dahl was considered a writer-of-note and his appearances in Hollywood to follow up with the film project were met with notices in Hedda Hopper's columns.

Facing copyright problems and realizing that the Air Ministry's "Clause 12" in the original film contract would restrict the studio, Walt Disney, who had a personal interest in The Gremlins, reluctantly began to "wind down" the project. By August 1943, Disney had even reconsidered an animated "short" based on The Gremlins and indicated to Dahl by correspondence that further work would not continue. After a year of story conferences and related research, Dahl realized that his book would be the only tangible product emanating from the aborted film.

Design
The original design had the small winged figure coming in for a landing with a red circle in the background; she is portrayed with horns, a yellow flight cap, a red top, yellow slacks, long black gloves, red high-top boots, and goggles. The WASPs, however, rather than having the figure in a landing pose, added a large bomb astride which the figure sat. They dressed her in a red coat and purple trousers and added a dark blue circle for extra impact. Still, there were many custom patches made, so form and color varied from patch to patch.

Use

Dahl's gremlins were subsequently used by Warner Bros. in several World War II cartoons, some involving Bugs Bunny and another called Russian Rhapsody, which featured scores of Russian-accented "Gremlins from the Kremlin" attacking an aircraft piloted by Adolf Hitler.

Fifinella put in appearances on WASP flight jackets and in many variations on the noses of bombers. One B-17G Flying Fortress, Fifinella (Serial #42-107030) of the 91st Bomb Group, was named after her. Fifinella was lost on August 13, 1944, on a bombing raid at Le Manoir, France. During the Korean War there was also a B-29 Superfortress (Serial #42-6569) of the 19th Bomb Group named Fifinella.

See also
Gremlin
Women Airforce Service Pilots

References
Notes

Citations

Bibliography

 Conant, Jennet. The Irregulars: Roald Dahl and the British Spy Ring in Wartime Washington. New York: Simon & Schuster, 2008. . 
 Dahl, Flight Lieutenant Roald. The Gremlins: The Lost Walt Disney Production. Milwaukie, OR: Dark Horse Books, 2006 (reprint and updated copy of 1943 original publication). .
 De La Rue, Keith. "Gremlins." delarue.net, updated August 23, 2004. Retrieved: October 11, 2010.
 "Gremlins." Fantastic Fiction, a British online book site/biography source. Retrieved: October 11, 2010.
 Sturrock, Donald. Storyteller: The Authorized Biography of Roald Dahl. New York: Simon & Schuster, 2010. .

External links
 The Gremlins: A Royal Air Force Story Commemoration of the 60th Anniversary of the U.S. Air Force, the Army Air Force Exchange Service distributed a limited edition of the 1943 children's book
 Sample Disney Fifinella mascot at USAF National Museum
 All about Fifinella at Wings Across America
 Crew photos at 91st Bomb Group 
 Women's Pilot Training Patch at National Museum of American History
 Letter from Walt Disney with a design for the WASP insignia

Fictional characters introduced in 1943
Disney animated characters
American mascots
Fictional women soldiers and warriors
Gremlins